Per Johan Karlsson (born 20 April 1989) is a Swedish professional footballer who plays for Tvååkers IF as a centre back.

Career
After seven seasons with Falkenbergs FF, Karlsson returned to his former club, Tvååkers IF, in February 2020.

References

External links

1989 births
Living people
Association football defenders
Falkenbergs FF players
Swedish footballers
Allsvenskan players
Superettan players
Vinbergs IF players
Tvååkers IF players
People from Falkenberg
Sportspeople from Halland County